The Gospel of Judas is a non-canonical Gnostic gospel. The content consists of conversations between Jesus and Judas Iscariot. Given that it includes late 2nd-century theology, it is widely thought to have been composed in the 2nd century (prior to 180 AD) by Gnostic Christians, rather than the historic Judas himself. The only copy of it known to exist is a Coptic language text that has been carbon dated to 280 AD, plus or minus 60 years. It has been suggested that the text derives from an earlier manuscript in the Greek language An English translation was first published in early 2006 by the National Geographic Society.

Significance
In contrast to the canonical gospels, which paint Judas as a betrayer who delivered Jesus to the authorities for crucifixion in exchange for money, the Gospel of Judas portrays Judas's actions as done in obedience to instructions given to him by Jesus. It asserts that the other disciples had not learned the true Gospel, which Jesus taught only to Judas, the sole follower belonging to (or set apart from) the "holy generation" among the disciples.

However, Dr. April Deconick challenges the National Geographic interpretation of the Gospel of Judas, contending instead that the text was written by a group of Sethians as a parody about a "demon" Judas.

Background

A leather-bound Coptic language papyrus document surfaced during the 1970s near Beni Masar, Egypt. It was  named Codex Tchacos by its penultimate owner, antiquities dealer Frieda Nussberger-Tchacos, in honor of her father, Dimaratos Tchacos. The antiquities dealer became concerned with the manuscript's deteriorating condition and transferred possession to the Maecenas Foundation for Ancient Art in Basel, Switzerland, in 2000, to oversee its preservation, translation and hopeful sale. On April 6, 2006, "the National Geographic Society in the US published the first translation of the text from Coptic to English ... and showed some of the papyrus pages for the first time."

The codex contains text that appears to be from the late 2nd century and includes the first known surviving copy of the self-titled "Gospel of Judas", which relates the story of Jesus's death from the viewpoint of Judas. The manuscript was radiocarbon dated and described by the National Geographic as showing a likely date between 220–340 AD.

The manuscript disintegrated into over a thousand pieces. Numerous sections are missing as a result of poor handling and storage. Some passages are only scattered words; others contain many lines. According to Coptic scholar Rodolphe Kasser, the codex originally contained 31 leaves, each written on both sides; by the time the codex came to the market in 1999, only 13 leaves survived. Individual leaves may have been removed and sold. The codex had been stored in a cardboard box for two decades as it was shopped around to potential buyers, and had, at various points, been stored in a freezer, a safety deposit box in Long Island, and folded in half.

Cited in support of this dating is the reference to a "Gospel of Judas" by the early Christian writer Irenaeus of Lyons, who, in arguing against Gnosticism, described the text as "fictitious history" and "blasphemous" heresies." However, it is uncertain whether the text mentioned by Irenaeus is in fact the same text as the Coptic "Gospel of Judas" found in the Codex Tchacos.

Content

Overview
The Gospel of Judas consists of 16 chapters which document Jesus's teaching about spiritual matters and cosmology. According to the text, Judas is the only one of Jesus's disciples who accurately understands the words of his master. This Gospel contains few narrative elements; essentially, the Gospel records how Judas was taught by Jesus the true meaning of his message.

The Gospel contains ideas which contradicted the doctrine of the early Church. The author says that God is essentially a "luminous cloud of light" who exists in an imperishable realm. Adamas, the spiritual father of all humanity, was created in God's image and dwelt in the imperishable realm.

At the beginning of time, God created a group of angels and lower gods. Twelve angels were willed to "come into being [to] rule over chaos and the [underworld]".
The angels of creation were tasked with creating a physical body for Adamas, which became known as the first man Adam.  Gradually, humanity began to forget its divine origins and some of Adam's descendants (Cain and Abel) became embroiled in the world's first murder. Many humans came to think that the imperfect physical universe was the totality of creation, losing their knowledge of God and the imperishable realm.

Jesus was sent as the Son of the true God, not of one of the lesser gods. His mission was to show that salvation consists in connecting with the God within the man. Through embracing the internal God, the man can then return to the imperishable realm.

Eleven of the disciples Jesus chose to spread his message misunderstood the central tenets of his teaching. They were obsessed with the physical world of the senses. The author says that they continued to practice religious animal sacrifice, which pleased the lower gods but did not help to foster a connection with the true God. They wrongly taught that those martyred in the name of Christ would be bodily resurrected.

In contrast, Jesus is able to teach Judas the true meaning of his life, ministry and death. Mankind can be divided into two races, or groups. Those who are furnished with the immortal soul, like Judas, can come to know the God within and enter the imperishable realm when they die. Those among the same group as the other eleven disciples cannot enter the realm of God and will die both spiritually and physically at the end of their lives. As practices that are intertwined with the physical world, animal sacrifice and a communion ceremony involving "cannibalism" (the consumption of Jesus' flesh and blood) are condemned as abhorrent. The other Gospels say that Jesus had to die in order to atone for the sins of humanity. The author of the Gospel of Judas expresses the view that this sort of substitutionary justice only pleases the lower gods and angels; that the true God is gracious and does not demand any sacrifice.

As a Gnostic text

Amy-Jill Levine, professor of New Testament Studies at Vanderbilt University Divinity School, was on the team of scholars responsible for unveiling the work. She said that the Gospel of Judas contains no new historical information concerning Jesus or Judas.

Historians Elaine Pagels and Karen Leigh King argue that a more nuanced, contextualized understanding of alternative interpretations of the Christian tradition should inform discussions of Gnosticism. In the centuries following Jesus's death, many differing views of the meaning of his life and death existed. Nicene Christianity (i.e. the views which came to be summarized in the doctrines contained in the Nicene Creed) existed alongside various cults (one of which was labelled 'Gnosticism') for centuries, until the Nicenian interpretation became accepted as "mainstream" Christianity.

Modern rediscovery
The initial translation of the Gospel of Judas was widely publicized but simply confirmed the account that was written in Irenaeus and known Gnostic beliefs, leading some scholars to simply summarize the discovery as nothing new. It is also argued that a closer reading of the existent text, as presented in October 2006, shows Christianity in a new light. According to Elaine Pagels, for instance, Judas is portrayed as having a mission to hand Jesus over to the soldiers. She says that Bible translators have mistranslated the Greek word for "handing over" to "betrayal".

Like many Gnostic works, the Gospel of Judas refers to itself as a secret account, specifically "The secret account of the revelation that Jesus spoke in conversation with Judas Iscariot...."

The Gospel of Judas states that Jesus told Judas "You shall be cursed for generations" and then added, "You will come to rule over them" and "You will exceed all of them, for you will sacrifice the man that clothes me."

Unlike the four canonical gospels, which employ narrative accounts of the last year of Jesus's life (in the case of John, three years) and of his birth (in the case of Luke and Matthew), the Judas gospel takes the form of dialogues between Jesus and Judas, and Jesus and the twelve disciples, without being embedded in any narrative. Such "dialogue gospels" were popular during the early decades of Christianity and the New Testament apocrypha contains several examples, such as the Gospel of Mary.

Like the canonical gospels, the Gospel of Judas portrays the scribes as approaching Jesus with the intention of arresting him, and Judas receiving money from them after handing Jesus over to them. However, unlike Judas in the canonical gospels, who is portrayed as a villain, and excoriated by Jesus ("Alas for that man by whom the Son of Man is betrayed. It would be better for that man if he had never been born," Mark 14:21; Matthew 26:24), the Judas gospel portrays Judas as a divinely appointed instrument of a grand and predetermined purpose. "In the last days they will curse your ascent to the holy (generation)."

Elsewhere in the manuscript, Jesus favours Judas above other disciples by saying, "Step away from the others and I shall tell you the mysteries of the kingdom," and "Look, you have been told everything. Lift up your eyes and look at the cloud and the light within it and the stars surrounding it. The star that leads the way is your star."

Rediscovery

The content of the gospel had been unknown until a Coptic Gospel of Judas turned up on the antiquities "grey market," in Geneva in May 1983, when it was found among a mixed group of Greek and Coptic manuscripts offered to Stephen Emmel, a Yale Ph.D. candidate commissioned by Southern Methodist University to inspect the manuscripts. How the manuscript (named the Codex Tchacos) was found, possibly in the late 1970s, has not been clearly documented. It is believed that a now-deceased Egyptian "treasure-hunter" or prospector discovered the codex near El Minya, Egypt, in the neighbourhood of the village Beni Masar, and sold it to one Hanna, a dealer in antiquities resident in Cairo.

In the 1970s, the manuscript and most of the dealer's other artifacts were stolen by a Greek trader named Nikolas Koutoulakis, and smuggled into Geneva. Hanna, along with Swiss antiquity traders, paid Koutoulakis a sum rumoured to be between $3 million to $10 million, recovered the manuscript and introduced it to experts who recognized its significance.

Sale and study
During the two decades after the codex's discovery, the manuscript was quietly offered to prospective buyers, but neither Egypt nor any major library were prepared to purchase a manuscript with such questionable provenance. In 2003 Michel van Rijn started to publish material about these dubious negotiations, and eventually the 62-page leather-bound codex was donated to the Maecenas Foundation in Basel. The previous owners now reported that it had been uncovered at Muhafazat al Minya in Egypt during the 1950s or 1960s, and that its significance had not been appreciated until recently. It is worth noting that various other locations had been alleged during previous negotiations.

The existence of the text was made public by former professor at the University of Geneva Rodolphe Kasser at a conference of Coptic specialists in Paris, July 2004. In a statement issued March 30, 2005, a spokesman for the Maecenas Foundation announced plans for edited translations into English, French, German, and Polish once the fragile papyrus had undergone conservation by a team of specialists in Coptic history to be led by Kasser, and that their work would be published in about a year. A. J. Tim Jull, director of the National Science Foundation Arizona AMS laboratory, and Gregory Hodgins, assistant research scientist, announced that a radiocarbon dating procedure had dated five samples from the papyrus manuscript from 220 to 340 in January 2005 at the University of Arizona. This puts the Coptic manuscript in the 3rd or 4th centuries, a century earlier than had originally been thought from analysis of the script. In January 2006, Gene A. Ware of the Papyrological Imaging Lab of Brigham Young University conducted a multi-spectral imaging process on the texts in Switzerland, and confirmed their authenticity. Joseph Barabe presented the behind-the-scenes story of the role an analysis of the ink played in authenticating the book at an American Chemical Society meeting.

Over the decades, the manuscript had been handled with less than sympathetic care: some single pages may be loose on the antiquities market (parts of two pages turned up in January 2006, in New York City); the text is now in over a thousand pieces and fragments, and is believed to be less than three-quarters complete. "After concluding the research, everything will be returned to Egypt. The work belongs there and they will be conserved in the best way," Roberty has stated.

In April 2006, an Ohio bankruptcy lawyer stated that he possessed several papyrus fragments from the Gospel of Judas, but refused to have the fragments authenticated. His report was viewed with skepticism by experts. Photographs of the fragments were later made available to Marvin Meyer and Gregor Wurst. Meyer presented their preliminary translation at Society of Biblical Literature Annual Meeting in New Orleans in November 2009.

In 2007, the National Geographic Society published the "Critical Edition" of the manuscript, which includes images of all the fragments, the reconstructed Coptic text, and English and French translations.

Responses and reactions
In his 2006 Easter address, Rowan Williams, the Archbishop of Canterbury, strongly denied the historical credibility of the gospel, saying:

 He went on to suggest that the book's publicity derived from a desire for conspiracy theories.

Scholarly debates
Kasser revealed a few details about the text in 2004, as reported by the Dutch paper . Its language is the same Sahidic dialect of Coptic in which Coptic texts of the Nag Hammadi Library are written. The codex has four parts:
 The Letter of Peter to Philip, already known from the Nag Hammadi Library
 The First Apocalypse of James, also known from the Nag Hammadi Library
 The first few pages of a work related to, but not the same as, the Nag Hammadi work Allogenes
 The Gospel of Judas

Up to a third of the codex is currently illegible.

A scientific paper was to be published in 2005, but was delayed. The completion of the restoration and translation was announced by the National Geographic Society at a news conference in Washington, D.C. on April 6, 2006, and the manuscript itself was unveiled then at the National Geographic Society headquarters, accompanied by a television special entitled The Gospel of Judas on April 9, 2006, which was aired on the National Geographic Channel.  Terry Garcia, an executive vice president for Mission Programs of the National Geographic Society, asserted that the codex is considered by scholars and scientists to be the most significant ancient, non-biblical text to be found since the 1940s. Conversely, James M. Robinson, general editor of the Nag Hammadi Library, predicted the new book would offer no historical insights into the disciple who betrayed Jesus, since the 2nd-century manuscript seems to derive from an older document. Robinson suggested that the text would provide insights into the religious situation during the 2nd century, rather than into the biblical narrative itself.

One scholar on the National Geographic project, professor Craig Evans, stated his belief that the document showed that Judas was "fooled" into believing he was helping Jesus. Another scholar, April D. DeConick, a professor of Biblical studies at Rice University, opined in an op-ed in The New York Times that the National Geographic translation was critically faulty in many substantial respects, and that based on a corrected translation, Judas was actually a demon, truly betraying Jesus, rather than following his orders. DeConick, after re-translating the text, published The Thirteenth Apostle: What the Gospel of Judas Really Says to assert that Judas was not a daimon in the Greek sense, but that "the universally accepted word for 'spirit' is 'pneuma'in Gnostic literature 'daimon' is always taken to mean 'demon'". She further stated that "Judas is not set apart 'for' the holy generation, as the National Geographic translation says, he is separated 'from' it." DeConick went on to ask, "Were they genuine errors or was something more deliberate going on?" The National Geographic Society responded that "virtually all issues April D. DeConick raises about translation choices are addressed in footnotes in both the popular and critical editions".

André Gagné, Professor at Concordia University in Montreal, also questioned how the experts of the National Geographic Society understood the role of Judas Iscariot in the Gospel of Judas. His argument rests on the translation of the Greco-Coptic term apophasis as "denial". According to Gagné, the opening lines of the Judas Gospel should not be translated as "the secret word of declaration by which Jesus spoke in conversation with Judas Iscariot" but rather as "the secret word of the denial by which Jesus spoke in conversation with Judas Iscariot" (Gospel of Judas 33:1). Gagné's conclusion is that this gospel is the story of the denial of true salvation for Judas.

In 2006 Géza Vermes commented the gospel was "a typical product of Greek (Platonic)-Christian speculation" representing Judas "assisting the Jewish authorities' arrest of Jesus and bringing about his liberation from the prison of his body". This view is exemplified by a passage where Jesus says to Judas, "For you will sacrifice the man that clothes me." (Gospel of Judas 56.1820)

Scholars are divided on the interpretation of the text. The first modern publication of the gospel contended that the text portrays Judas in a positive light, while other scholars have asserted that Judas is presented negatively. There is no consensus on how Judas is characterized in this gospel.

There may be additional fragments of the gospel yet to be released.

CNN TV series entitled "Finding Jesus – Faith, Fact, Forgery" featured The Gospel of Judas in its 3rd episode which was aired on March 15, 2015.

Uniqueness of the codex
The president of the Maecenas Foundation, Mario Roberty, suggested the possibility that the Maecenas Foundation had acquired not the only extant copy of the Gospel, but rather the only known copy. Roberty went on to suggest that the Vatican probably had another copy locked away, saying:

Roberty provided no evidence to suggest that the Vatican does, in fact, possess any additional copy. While the contents of one part of the Vatican library have been catalogued and have long been available to researchers and scholars, the remainder of the library is without a public catalogue, and though researchers may view any work within, they must first name the text they require, a serious problem for those who do not know what is contained by the library. The Pope responded on April 13, 2006:

Spokespersons say the Vatican does not wish to suppress the Gospel of Judas; rather, according to Monsignor Walter Brandmüller, president of the Vatican's Committee for Historical Science, "We welcome the [manuscript] like we welcome the critical study of any text of ancient literature."

Even more explicitly, Father Thomas D. Williams, Dean of Theology at the Regina Apostolorum university in Rome, when asked, "Is it true that the Catholic Church has tried to cover up this text and other apocryphal texts?" answered, "These are myths circulated by Dan Brown and numerous conspiracy theorists. You can go to any Catholic bookstore and pick up a copy of the Gnostic gospels. Christians may not believe them to be true, but there is no attempt to hide them."

Works with similar themes
Prior to the modern discovery of the Gospel of Judas, a number of other works had independently conceived of the idea of Jesus having foreknowingly submitted himself to crucifixion.

"Tres versiones de Judas" (1944) is a short story by Jorge Luis Borges (from the collection Ficciones) in which a fictional Swedish theologian proposes that Judas is the actual savior of mankind.

Beelzebub's Tales to His Grandson (1950), a long work by the mystic G. I. Gurdjieff which covers a wide range of topics, presents Judas in accordance with his depiction in the Gospel of Judas.

The Last Temptation of Christ (1955) is a novel by Nikos Kazantzakis (and 1988 film by Martin Scorsese) that depicts Judas in a similar vein to the Gospel of Judas.

The Passover Plot (1965), a nonfiction book by the biblical scholar Hugh J. Schonfield, presents the theory that Jesus had set out to ensure his execution in advance, enlisting the help of his apostles, including Judas.

Jesus Christ Superstar (1971) is a rock opera composed by Andrew Lloyd Webber, lyrics by Tim Rice. In songs, it documents from the perspective of Judas himself, the narrator, the life and death of Judas and his reasons for betraying Jesus—Judas says that Jesus himself wanted to die so his movement would carry on.  The musical portrays Jesus as a human, full of self-doubt but able to predict the future accurately when he says, "One of you denies me, one of you betrays me."

The plot of A Time for Judas (1983), a novel by Morley Callaghan, also has a plot similar to that of the Gospel of Judas.

Notes

References

English translation

Citations

Sources cited

Further reading

External links

 The Judas Gospel – online feature from the National Geographic Society
 CHERIX, P., Évangile de Judas, 2007–2012, sur Coptica.ch – texte, index et traduction française
 Gospel of Judas: Survey of Early Reactions and Commentary

2nd-century Christian texts
Cainite texts
Gnostic Gospels
Judas Iscariot
Sethian texts
Texts in Coptic